Marmarospondylus ("marble [reference to the Forest Marble Formation] vertebra") is a dubious genus of sauropod dinosaur from Middle Jurassic deposits in the English Midlands.

The type species, Marmarospondylus robustus, was described by Richard Owen as a species of the Late Jurassic genus Bothriospondylus in 1875. The holotype, NHMUK R.22428, a dorsal, was found in the Bathonian-age Forest Marble Formation at Bradford-on-Avon, Wiltshire. Owen himself in an addendum to the same publication coined Marmarospondylus for B. robustus, presumably due to its being older than B. suffossus. Recent publications have treated Marmarospondylus as a dubious member of Macronaria.

References

Macronarians
Bathonian genera
Middle Jurassic dinosaurs of Europe
Jurassic England
Fossils of England
Fossil taxa described in 1875
Taxa named by Richard Owen
Nomina dubia
Sauropods of Europe
Middle Jurassic sauropods